Nancy R. Howell (born 23 January 1953) is an American professor of Theology and Philosophy of Religion at Saint Paul School of Theology in Kansas City, Missouri.

Biography 

Howell earned a B.S. at The College of William and Mary, and a Th.M. and M.Div. at the Southeastern Baptist Theological Seminary. Howell earned a M.A. and Ph.D. at Claremont Graduate School. During her doctoral studies she studied with, and was the teaching assistant for, John B. Cobb. She initially worked as the academic dean of Saint Paul School of Theology.

Howell's research and teaching explore the intersections of ethology, genetics, evolution, ecology, and theology with attention to the social location of the worldviews shaping the fields. Howell is a founding member of the prestigious International Society for Science and Religion. A long-standing supporter of professional societies dedicated to science and religion research, Howell served on the academic board of the Metanexus Institute and is a member of the Center for Theology and the Natural Sciences and the Institute on Religion in an Age of Science. She is a steering committee member for the Kansas City Religion and Science Dialogue Project and Vice President of the Highlands Institute for American Religious and Philosophical Thought—both projects are recipients of Local Societies Initiative grants for programming in science and religion.

Published works

References

External links
Nancy R. Howell Official Website

1953 births
Living people
Saint Paul School of Theology faculty
American feminists
College of William & Mary alumni
Claremont Graduate University alumni
Members of the International Society for Science and Religion
Process theologians
Women theologians